Machu Qasem (also Romanized as Machū Qāsem) is a village in Bampur-e Sharqi Rural District, in the Central District of Bampur County, Sistan and Baluchestan Province, Iran. At the 2006 census, its population was 1,034, in 212 families.

References 

Populated places in Bampur County